An asteroid is a minor planet.

Asteroid or Asteroids may also refer to:

Astrophysics
Asteroid belt
Asteroid moon

Art, entertainment, and media

Films
Asteroid (film), a 1997 TV movie

Games
Asteroid (board game), published by Game Designers' Workshop, 1980
Asteroids (video game), 1979 arcade game

Music
Asteroid 1976, a 2008 album by Taiwanese rock band 1976
Asteroid (Pearl & Dean theme), a piece of music used to introduce cinema advertising reels distributed by Pearl & Dean
"Asteroid", a song by Killing Joke from the album Killing Joke
"Asteroid", a song by Kyuss from the album Welcome to Sky Valley
"Asteroid", a song by Pentagon from the album Universe: The Black Hall

Other uses
Asteroids in astrology
Asteroid (horse), a racehorse

See also 
Asteroidea, the class of sea stars
Asteroideae, the subfamily of flowering plants
Astroid, a mathematical curve
Asterids, a clade of flowering plants